Knot Gneiss is a fantasy novel by British-American writer Piers Anthony, the 34th book of the Xanth series.

Plot introduction
This is about Jumper's friend Wenda Woodwife, who has a nymphly front but no back, being hollow from behind, who speaks with the forest dialect: "I wood knot dew that to yew." She has to transport a boulder made of petrified reverse wood that naturally terrifies (petrifies) everyone else. She has to put together a group of six or more and starts out her journey asking help from her best friend Jumper, King of the Spiders, and enlists the aid of a winged mermaid, the Princess Ida, a fallen angel, and a handsome prince in search of his princess

 34
2010 American novels
Tor Books books